The 1957 Oklahoma Sooners football team represented the University of Oklahoma during the 1957 NCAA University Division football season. They played their home games at Oklahoma Memorial Stadium in Norman, Oklahoma, and were members of the Big Seven Conference. They were two-time defending national champions (1955, 1956), led by head coach Bud Wilkinson, in his eleventh season.

The Sooners won their first seven games in 1957, but were upset at home by unranked Notre Dame on November 16, stopping Oklahoma's record-breaking win streak at  It was their only loss of the season; they finished fourth in both final polls in early  and won the Orange Bowl

Schedule

Rankings

Postseason

NFL Draft
The following players were drafted into the National Football League following the season.

References

Oklahoma
Oklahoma Sooners football seasons
Big Eight Conference football champion seasons
Orange Bowl champion seasons
Oklahoma Sooners football